"Breakin' Down" is a song by Skid Row and released as a single from their third album, Subhuman Race. The song was released in 1995 and written by Dave "the Snake" Sabo.

Background
The song is known for its use in the Christopher Walken film The Prophecy.

"Breakin' Down" features a music video and a remix of the song was included on the bands compilation album, 40 Seasons: The Best of Skid Row.

The song charted at #48 on the UK Singles chart.

Track listings

UK 7” green vinyl
 “Breakin’ Down” (LP Version)
 “Riot Act” (Live)

UK CD1 (Part 1 of a 2 CD Set)
 "Breakin' Down" (LP Version)
 "Firesign" (Demo)
 "Slave to the Grind" (Live)
 "Monkey Business" (Live)

UK CD2 (Part 2 of a 2 CD Set)
 "Breakin' Down" (LP Version)
 "Frozen" (Demo)
 "Beat Yourself Blind" (Live)
 "Psycho Therapy" (Live) [originally performed by The Ramones]

Germany CD
 "Breakin' Down" (LP Version)
 "Firesign" (Demo)
 "Frozen" (Demo)

US CD
 “Breakin’ Down”
 “Monkey Business” (Live)
 “Slave to the Grind” (Live)

US Promo CD
 “Breakin’ Down” (Remix)
 “Breakin’ Down” (LP Version)

Charts

References

Skid Row (American band) songs
1995 singles
1995 songs
Songs written by Dave Sabo
Atlantic Records singles
Song recordings produced by Bob Rock
American alternative rock songs